Jacques Rheins was a French bobsledder. He competed in the four-man event at the 1928 Winter Olympics.

References

External links
 

Year of birth missing
Possibly living people
French male bobsledders
Olympic bobsledders of France
Bobsledders at the 1928 Winter Olympics
Place of birth missing